This is an incomplete list of paintings by Impressionist painter Pierre-Auguste Renoir. Renoir painted about 4000 paintings that have sold at auction for as much as $78.1 million (in 1990). The largest collection of Renoir paintings is at the Barnes Foundation in Philadelphia, Pennsylvania, United States.

1860–1869

1870–1879

1880–1889

1890–1899

1900–1909

1910–1919

Interactive image

Close-ups

References

Renoir